Matthew Ryan "Matt" McGinley (born February 24, 1983) is the co-founder and former drummer of Gym Class Heroes and a contributing music producer to the nationally syndicated radio program This American Life.

Career
Matt McGinley is the drummer and co-founder of the band Gym Class Heroes (Atlantic Records). Independent of the band, he has toured and performed with a range of other artists including Ryn Weaver, Wafia, and Ben Abraham.

He is a contributing music producer to the nationally syndicated radio show, This American Life. And has composed original music for other critically acclaimed podcast series, including Serial and S-Town.

McGinley also worked with experimental post-hardcore band The Bunny the Bear as a studio drummer for their three releases Stories, Food Chain, and A Liar Wrote This. He was accompanied by producer and guitarist Doug White, who had previously worked with Gym Class Heroes.

Education
McGinley attended the State University of New York at Oneonta from 2001–2004  and holds a B.A. from Boston University, which he pursued while touring with Gym Class Heroes.

References 

Gym Class Heroes members
American drummers
1983 births
Living people
Musicians from New York (state)
State University of New York at Oneonta alumni
21st-century American drummers